This is a list of the largest cities in the European Union according to the population within their city boundary. The cities listed all have populations over 300,000. The list deals exclusively with the areas within city administrative boundaries as opposed to urban areas or larger urban zones (metropolitan areas), which are generally larger in terms of population than the main city.

As some cities have a very narrow boundary and others a very wide, the list may not give an accurate view of the comparative magnitude of different places, and the figures in the list should be treated with caution. Paris is the most populous urban area in the European Union, but the strict definition of the administrative limits of the City of Paris results in a far lower population shown in the table. Likewise the City of Brussels municipality is so much smaller than the greater Brussels Capital Region that it does not reach the population threshold to be listed here.

Cities by population within the city boundary
Cities in bold are capital cities of their respective countries.

See also

List of European cities by population within city limits
List of urban areas in the European Union
List of urban areas in Europe
List of metropolitan areas in Europe
List of larger urban zones (metropolitan area)
List of urban areas by population
Blue Banana
Golden Banana

References

Cities by population within city limits
European Union
European Union, by population within city limits
Cities-related lists of superlatives
Demographics of the European Union